"Love Make the World Go Round" is a charity single recorded by American entertainer Jennifer Lopez and American composer Lin-Manuel Miranda. It was written by Lopez, Miranda, Mike Molina, Melody Noel Hernandez, John Mitchell, Nelson Kyle, Marcus Lomax, Jordan Johnson and Stefan Johnson, and produced by The Agency and The Monsters & Strangerz. The song was released exclusively on the iTunes Store in the United States on July 8, 2016, by Epic Records. All proceeds from "Love Make the World Go Round" were donated to the Hispanic Federation's Somos Orlando fund, which provided care and resources to the victims of the Orlando nightclub shooting.

Background
Proceeds of the song will go toward the Hispanic Federation's Proyecto Somos Orlando initiative, which "will address the long-term needs for mental health services that are culturally competent and bilingual. Proyecto will enable care to be delivered to those affected directly in the communities in which they live. Beyond emergency assistance, they will be provided with case management, crisis intervention and mental health services, among other needs."

Composition
"Love Make the World Go Round" is a dance song, with a length of three minutes and fifty-six seconds (3:56). It was written by Lopez, Miranda, Mike Molina, Melody Noel Hernandez, John Mitchell, Nelson Kyle, Marcus Lomax, Jordan Johnson and Stefan Johnson, and produced by The Agency and The Monsters & Strangerz. Background vocals performed by Candace Wakefield. The song features a dancehall-inspired, pop-infused beat with "lyrics calling for unity, compassion, understanding, and love in the face of darkness".

Critical reception
Robbie Daw of Idolator gave the song eight out of ten stars, praising it as a "Worldly" and "inspiring" track with an "instantly catchy groove", while noting: "Snippets of Lin-Manuel Miranda's Tony acceptance sonnet are employed in such a way that the addition doesn’t feel forced. Plus, Lopez's vocals are top notch here." Another writer from the website, Rachel Sonis, added that "With its infectious, sun-kissed melody and uplifting lyrics of love and unity, this song makes light out of such a tragic time in human history. It's simple, hopeful and, ultimately, something we all desperately need right now."

Chart performance
The single debuted at number 72 on the US Billboard Hot 100 and number 9 on the US Digital Songs chart, with 54,000 downloads sold in its first week. The song marks Miranda's first appearance on "Billboard" charts as a solo artist.

Music video
On the same day of the single's release, Lopez and Miranda were spotted filming the music video of the song on the rooftop of the Richard Rodgers Theatre the same theater Miranda's Broadway hit, Hamilton, plays.

On August 9, Lopez' premiered "the making" music video of the song through her official facebook account.

Live performances
Lopez and Miranda first performed the song on July 11, just three days after its release, on Today. The day after they both performed the song again on The Tonight Show Starring Jimmy Fallon.

Charts

Release history

References

2016 singles
2016 songs
Charity singles
Songs written by Lin-Manuel Miranda
Jennifer Lopez songs
Orlando nightclub shooting
Songs written by Jennifer Lopez
Songs written by Stefan Johnson
Songs written by Jordan Johnson (songwriter)
LGBT-related songs